Standings and results for Group 4 of the UEFA Euro 1984 qualifying tournament.

Group 4 consisted of Bulgaria, Norway, Wales and Yugoslavia. Group winners were Yugoslavia, who finished a point clear of second-placed Wales.

Final table

Results

Goalscorers

References

UEFA Page
RSSSF

4
1982–83 in Welsh football
1983–84 in Welsh football
1982–83 in Yugoslav football
1983–84 in Yugoslav football
Yugoslavia at UEFA Euro 1984
1982–83 in Bulgarian football
1983–84 in Bulgarian football
1982 in Norwegian football
1983 in Norwegian football